The Town-class destroyers were a group of 50 destroyers of the Royal Navy and the Royal Canadian Navy that were in service during the Second World War. They were transferred from the United States Navy in exchange for military bases in the British West Indies and Newfoundland, as outlined in the Destroyers for Bases Agreement between Britain and United States, signed on 2 September 1940. They were known as "four-pipers" or "four-stackers" because they had four smokestacks (funnels). Later classes of destroyers typically had one or two.

Some went to the Royal Canadian Navy at the outset. Others went on to the Royal Norwegian Navy, the Royal Netherlands Navy, and the Soviet Navy after serving with the Royal Navy. "Town class" refers to the Admiralty's practice of renaming these ships after towns common to the United States and the British Commonwealth. Ships initially commissioned into the Royal Canadian Navy, however, followed the Canadian practice of giving destroyers the names of Canadian rivers. The rivers selected for the Town class were on the border between Canada and the United States, with the exception of Annapolis — the name of both a river in Annapolis County, Nova Scotia, and the location of the United States Naval Academy.

One of the Towns achieved lasting fame:  (ex-). In the Commando raid Operation Chariot, Campbeltown, fitted with a large demolition charge, rammed the gates of the Normandie dock at Saint-Nazaire, France. This exploit was depicted in the 1950 Trevor Howard film The Gift Horse, which starred  (ex-) after her return from service in Russia.

Characteristics
Built for service during the First World War, but in the main completed after the end of that conflict, the flush-deckers were, by 1940, the oldest destroyers in the US Navy, and many had been mothballed for the inter-war period. 
While contemporaneous to the British s they were not much liked by their crews. While the V and W classes set a new standard for destroyer design, the flush-deckers were already obsolescent by comparison. They were uncomfortable and wet, working badly in a seaway. Their hull lines were rather narrow and 'herring-gutted' which gave them a vicious roll. The officers didn't like the way they handled either, since they had been built with propellers that turned the same way (2-screw ships normally have the shafts turning in opposite directions as the direction of rotation has effects on the rudder and the whole ship when manoeuvring, especially when coming alongside), so these were as awkward to handle as single-screw ships. Their turning circle was enormous, as big as most Royal Navy battleships, making them difficult to use in a submarine hunt which demanded tight manoeuvres, compounded by unreliable "chain and cog" steering gear laid across the main deck. They also had fully enclosed bridges which caused problems with reflections in the glass at night. One Royal Canadian Navy corvette captain described them as "the most dubious gift since the Trojan Horse".
However, despite their disadvantages they were a welcome addition to forces escorting convoys in the Atlantic at a time when the U-boats, operating from newly acquired bases on the Atlantic coast of France were becoming an increasingly serious threat to British shipping. They were also seen as an earnest of the United States’ commitment to support Britain against Nazism.

The original armament was four 4-inch (102 mm) guns, one 3-inch (76 mm) anti-aircraft gun, and twelve torpedo tubes. On the Wickes-class, the 4-inch gun placement was one gun in a shield on the forecastle, one on the quarterdeck and one each side on a platform between the number 2 and number 3 funnels. The Admiralty promptly removed one of the 4-inch guns and six torpedo tubes to improve stability. Twenty-three of the class had further armament reductions for anti-submarine escort of trade convoys. Two of the remaining 4-inch guns and three of the remaining torpedo tubes were removed to allow increased depth charge stowage and installation of Hedgehog anti-submarine mortar system.

Ships in class by origin
The ships were divided by the Royal Navy into four groups based on their characteristics.
They were armed with four single 4-inch guns and one 3-inch anti-aircraft gun, with triple 21" torpedo tubes. Overall length was 314 ft 4 in, beam 31 ft 8 in and draught 12 ft 10 in.
Type B were the 12 ships of the  built to plans prepared by the Bath Iron Works. These were lighter than the type A ships, with a displacement of 1090 tons but they had the same armament and machinery with a slightly better speed of 28.75 kt.
Type C were the 15 ships of the Wickes class built to plans prepared by Bethlehem Steel, with a displacement of 1060 tons and an improved speed of 29.75 kt.
The type D vessels were recognizable also in having only 3 funnels.

Ships in class by operator

Royal Canadian Navy

RCN (loaned from the Royal Navy)

Royal Navy

Royal Netherlands Navy

Royal Norwegian Navy

Soviet Navy

Notes

References
 
R Gardiner, R Gray (1985) Conway's All the World's Fighting Ships 1906–1921  
 
 Hague, Arnold (1988) Destroyers for Great Britain: A History of the 50 Town Class Ships Transferred From the United States to Great Britain in 1940. Naval Institute Press, Annapolis  (Limited view at archive.org)
 
 Roskill, SW (1954) The War at Sea: 1939-1945 Vol I.  HMSO (ISBN: none)

External links

Battle of the Atlantic
Destroyer classes
North Atlantic convoys of World War II
Ship classes of the Royal Navy
Ships of the Royal Canadian Navy
Soviet Union–United Kingdom relations